Carole is a feminine given name (see Carl for more information) and occasionally a surname.

Carole may refer to:

Given name

Carole B. Balin (born 1964), American Reform rabbi, professor of Jewish history
Carole Bayer Sager (born 1947), American lyricist, singer, songwriter, painter
Carole Byard (1941–2017), American visual artist, illustrator, and photographer
Carole Bouquet (born 1958), French actress, fashion model
Carole Bureau-Bonnard (born 1965), French politician
Carole Cadwalladr (born 1969), British author and investigative journalist
Carole Cains (born 1943), Australian former politician
Carole Cook (1924–2023), American actress
Carole David (born 1954), Canadian poet and novelist
Carole Davis (born 1958) British model and actress
Carole Delga (born 1971), French politician
Carole Demas (born 1940), American actress
Carole Doyle Peel (1934–2016), American visual artist
Carole Eastman (1934–2004), American actress and screenwriter.
Carole Easton, British psychotherapist
Carole Feuerman (born 1945), American artist, hyper-realistic sculptor
Carole Freeman (born 1949), Canadian politician
Carole Gaessler (born 1968), French television journalist
Carole Goble (born 1961), British academic and computer scientist
Carole Grandjean (born 1983), French politician
Carole Graves (born 1938), American politician
Carole Gray (born 1938), Zimbabwean former dancer and actress
 Carole Hill, American anthropologist and professor
Carole Jacques (born 1960), Canadian politician from Quebec
Carole Jahme, British biographer
Carole James (born 1957), Canadian politician, former public administrator
Carole Joffe, American sociologist
Carole King (born 1942), American singer-songwriter
Carole Knight (born 1957), British table tennis player
Carole Landis (1919–1948), American actress
Carole Lavallée (1954–2021), Canadian politician from Quebec
Carole Lombard (1908–1942), American actress
Carole Malone (born 1954), British journalist and political commentator
Carole Maso, American novelist and writer
Carole LaBonne, American scientist
Carole Poirier (born 1958), Canadian politician
Carole Radziwill (born 1963), American journalist, author, and reality television personality
Carole Richards (1922–2007), American singer
 Carole Robertson, victim of the 1963 16th Street Baptist Church bombing
Carole Roussopoulos (1945–2009) Swiss film director and feminist
Carole Shelley (1939–2018), English actress
Carole Shepheard (born 1945), New Zealand artist
Carole Ward Allen, American politician, professor and political consultant
Carole Zahi (born 1994), French sprinter

Surname
Lionel Carole (born 1991), French footballer
Sébastien Carole (born 1982), French footballer

Other uses
Carole, Medieval dance

See also

Carle (disambiguation)
Carol
Carola
Carolle
Carrol
Carroll
Caroly (name)

French feminine given names
English feminine given names